

See also 
 Lists of fossiliferous stratigraphic units in Europe

References 
 

 Netherlands
Geology of the Netherlands
Fossiliferous stratigraphic units